Antiochia Paraliou is an ancient city known only from its coinage which bears the legend "ΑΝΤΙΟΧΕΩΝ ΤΗΣ ΠΑΡΑΛΙΟΥ".  Although the location is considered unknown, some numismatists equate the city with Antiochia ad Cragum, but the association is not universally accepted.

External links
 homepage.uibk.ac.at

Ancient Greek archaeological sites in Turkey
Seleucid colonies in Anatolia
Former populated places in Turkey